HMS F2 was a British F class submarine of the Royal Navy. She was built at J. Samuel White at Cowes, laid down 30 November 1914 and launched 7 July 1917.

F2 was sold for scrapping in Portsmouth in 1922.

References

External links

 

British F-class submarines
1917 ships
Royal Navy ship names